Yvonne Lammerich (born 1946) is a Canadian visual artist, curator and writer. Her work, largely in painting and installation,  "articulates the simultaneity of experiencing the body's response as we navigate both real and projected space."

Early life and education
Yvonne Lammerich was born in Germany in 1946, daughter to Frederic Lammerich and Barbara Dobzinski. She immigrated to Canada in 1959 with her family.  She graduated from Ontario College of Art, received a MA in Art History from Concordia University and a PhD from Université du Québec à Montréal.  Lammerich currently resides in Rednersville, Ontario.

Career
From 1975 to 1976, while living in Bristol, England, Lammerich conducted research at the Brain and Perception Laboratory with Richard Gregory, University of Bristol.  She lived and worked in Montreal, from 1985 to 2002, before moving back to Toronto. In 1991, she became the Artistic Director for Baie Saint Paul International Painting Symposium and a board member at Gallery Optica, from 1986 to 1993.   In 1996 she received the Canada Council's Maria Stafford Mid-Career Prize.  She taught at the York University, the OCAD University, the University of Lethbridge and  Zayed University in Dubai, 2010 to 2011.

Exhibitions
Lammerich has exhibited at the University of Lethbridge Art Gallery (2008), the Museum of Contemporary Canadian Art, Toronto (2010), the Barnicke Gallery, University of Toronto (2011) and the Bonavista Biennale, Newfoundland (2019).

Public art
Lamerich's work Writing to You, a collaboration with Ian Carr-Harris, is part of the City of Vancouver public art collection.

References

Further reading 
  Voices: Artists on art, an project conceived by Yvonne Lammerich and Ian Carr-Harris OCAD University, 2017.
 Montreal Interview with Yvonne Lammerich Sylvie Parent ETC, 1998.

External links 

1946 births
Living people
Canadian contemporary painters
20th-century Canadian women artists
21st-century Canadian women artists
Canadian women painters
21st-century Canadian painters
20th-century Canadian painters
Canadian women curators